Tempio Valdese is a Protestant church in Milan, Italy. It was built in 1950.

The Waldensian Church in Milan incorporates the façade of the now demolished church of San Giovanni in Conca, which was located in Piazza Missori. 

Religious buildings and  structures completed in 1959
Waldensianism
Gothic Revival church buildings in Italy
Protestant churches in Italy
Churches in the metropolitan city of Milan
Buildings and structures in Milan